John "Jack" James Cound (born February 7, 1928), is an American legal scholar, an  expert in civil procedure. For 35 years he was a professor at the University of Minnesota Law School, where he taught admiralty, civil procedure, complex litigation, conflict of laws, evidence, federal courts, and professional responsibility.

Biography

Cound received his B.A. degree from George Washington University. He earned an LL.B. degree from Harvard Law School, where he graduated magna cum laude, and was Note Editor of the Harvard Law Review. Upon completion of his LL.B. degree, Cound clerked for Judge Learned Hand of the United States Court of Appeals for the Second Circuit. He then served as an attorney for the Appellate Section of the Civil Division of the United States Department of Justice. The first case that Cound helped handle at the Department of Justice was Brown v. Board of Education.

Cound joined the faculty of the University of Minnesota Law School in 1956. He was a Visiting Professor at the UCLA Law School, University of North Carolina School of Law, University of Texas School of Law, University of Georgia School of Law, University of Kentucky College of Law, Washington University School of Law, Hamline University School of Law, and the University of Kiel in Kiel, Germany. He also served on the faculty of the Association of American Law Schools Orientation Program in American Law.

Cound i  published important academic works over the course of his career. These include: Civil Procedure: Cases and Materials (1st ed. 1968 & Supp. 1968, 2d ed. 1974, 3d ed. 1980, 4th ed. 1985) (with Jack H. Friedenthal & Arthur R. Miller); Civil Procedure Supplement (1968, 1970, 1972, 1974, 1976, 1978, 1980, 1982, 1984, 1985) (with Jack H. Friedenthal & Arthur R. Miller), Minnesota Jury Instruction Guides, Criminal (1977) (reporter), Pleading, Joinder, and Discovery: Cases and Materials (1968) (with Jack H. Friedenthal & Arthur R. Miller).

Cound resides in St. Paul, Minnesota, with his wife Jeanne.

References

External links 
 University of Minn. Bio Page

Living people
1928 births
Hamline University faculty
University of Minnesota faculty
University of Minnesota Law School faculty
UCLA School of Law faculty
University of Texas at Austin faculty
University of Kentucky faculty
Washington University in St. Louis faculty
University of North Carolina School of Law faculty
George Washington University alumni
Harvard Law School alumni
Law clerks of Judge Learned Hand
American lawyers
American civil servants
Legal writers
Legal educators
American legal scholars